The Applegate Drugstore is a historic commercial building at 116 South First Street in Rogers, Arkansas.  It is a two-story masonry building, with brick sidewalls and a limestone facade.  Pilasters of alternating rough and smooth stone delineate the first floor elements of the storefront, rising to a freeze and dentillated ogee course between the floors.  The second floor has two large bays, each with a pair of sash windows, delineated by Corinthian pilasters.  The interior of the store retains original drugstore furnishings, including a pressed tin ceiling, tile floor, walnut shelving, and a polished marble fountain counter.  The building was constructed in 1906 to house the drugstore of J.E. Applegate, and has housed similar retail operations since then.  The building has one of Rogers' best-preserved early-20th century commercial interiors.

The building was listed on the National Register of Historic Places in 1982.

See also
National Register of Historic Places listings in Benton County, Arkansas

References

Commercial buildings on the National Register of Historic Places in Arkansas
Commercial buildings completed in 1906
Buildings and structures in Rogers, Arkansas
National Register of Historic Places in Benton County, Arkansas
Individually listed contributing properties to historic districts on the National Register in Arkansas
1906 establishments in Arkansas